Trapusa and Bahalika (alternatively Bhallika) are traditionally regarded as the first disciples  of the Buddha. The first account of Trapusa and Bahalika appears in the Vinaya section of the Tripiṭaka where they offer the Buddha his first meal after enlightenment, take refuge in the Dharma (while the Sangha was still not established), and become the Buddha's first disciples. Xuanzang says that Buddhism was brought to Central Asia by Trapusa and Bahalika (referring to Balkh) two merchants who offered food to the Buddha after his enlightenment.

The era of Trapusa and Bahalika is during the life of the Historical Buddha: most early 20th-century historians dated his birth and death as  BCE to 483 BCE, but more recent research dates his death to between 486 and 483 BCE or, according to others, between 411 and 400 BCE (or between 623 and 624 BCE).

Regional versions

Central Asia

Xuanzang recounts, having become his first disciples Trapusa and Bahalika wished his leave to return home, they asked the Buddha for something by which they could remember and honour him in his absence. The Buddha gave them eight of his hairs as relics. They made golden caskets for the relics and took them to their own city (Balkh) where they enshrined them in a stupa by the city gate. See Nava Vihara.

Xuanzang recounts that theirs was the first ever Buddhist Stupa to be made and that the Buddha had first to instruct them how to erect it by folding his three robes into squares piling them up and then topping them off with his inverted bowl.

Sri Lanka
What is stated in the chronicles of Sri Lanka is that, two merchant brothers, Thapassu and Bhalluka, who travel to different parts in the region, met the Buddha just after his Enlightenment while they were on their way to Rajagaha (Rajgir).  They offered the first alms to the Buddha. Taking refuge in the Buddha and the Dhamma they became the first lay disciples of the Buddha.  Requesting the Buddha something to worship, the Buddha gave them, eight handfuls of his hair, which he obtained by stroking his head.  During their travel they arrived at Thiriyaya (North-East of Sri Lanka) from India.  At Thiriyaya, some of the hair relics they brought were enshrined at a Stupa built on top of a mountain which is now called Girihandu Seya.  That is considered the first Stupa in Sri Lanka.

Myanmar 
According to the Buddhavaṃsa, Tapussa and Bhallika — two merchant brothers from Ukkalājanapada — were passing through Bodh Gaya when they encountered the Buddha. The Buddha, who was at that time enjoying the bliss of his newly attained buddhahood as he sat under a rājāyatana tree, accepted their offering of rice cake and honey and taught them some of the dharma in return. In so doing, they became the first lay disciples to take refuge in the teachings of the Buddha. The Buddha also gave eight strands of his hair to the merchants and gave them instructions on how to construct a stupa in which to enshrine these hair relics. The merchants presented the eight strands of hair to King Okkalapa of Dagon, who enshrined the strands along with some relics of the three preceding Buddhas (Kakusandha, Koṇāgamana, and Kassapa) in the Shwedagon Pagoda on Singuttara Hill, in present-day Myanmar.

Significance
John S. Strong draws attention to Trapusa and Bahalika's legacy of pioneers:

See also
 Buddhism in Afghanistan
 Pre-Islamic Hindu and Buddhist heritage of Afghanistan
 Buddhism in Pakistan
 Pre-sectarian Buddhism
 Silk Road transmission of Buddhism
 Tripiṭaka
 Vinaya Pitaka
 Nava Vihara
 Stupa

References

External links
 Iranica Online: Buddhism in Pre-Islamic Times

Early Buddhism
Foremost disciples of Gautama Buddha
Buddhism in Afghanistan
People from Balkh Province